Flax Island was an island located by Otego, New York, on the Susquehanna River below the mouth of Flax Island Creek. In a deed from 1807 it is called Flax Island, and also Vrooman's Island. It has since washed away.

It was where Indians grew wild flax or hemp. The hemp was a necessity to the Indians, who called the surrounding area Otsdawa which translates to "the place of the big hemp".

References

Islands of the Susquehanna River in New York (state)
Islands of New York (state)